Francesco Ardizzone (born 17 February 1992) is an Italian footballer who plays as a midfielder for  club Lecco on loan from Turris.

Club career
Born in Palermo, Sicily, Ardizzone started his professional career at U.S. Città di Palermo. He was the member of the reserve from 2009 to 2011. Ardizzone made his debut in the last group stage match of 2010–11 UEFA Europa League on 15 December 2010.

Reggiana
On 1 July 2011 Ardizzone left for Italian third division club Reggiana along with Adriano Siragusa, as part of the deal that Gianluca Di Chiara moved to Palermo. Both clubs retained 50% registration rights of Ardizzone and Di Chiara. Half of the "card" of Di Chiara was valued for €140,000 at that time.

Ardizzone made 21 appearances in 2011–12 Lega Pro Prima Divisione. In June 2012 Reggiana acquired Ardizzone outright.

Pro Vercelli
On 29 August 2013 Ardizzone was sold to F.C. Pro Vercelli 1892 in another co-ownership deal for a peppercorn of €500. In June 2014 the co-ownership of Ardizzone and Mattia Bani were renewed.

Cesena
On 17 January 2020 he signed a 1.5-year contract with Serie C club Cesena.

Turris
On 19 July 2022, Ardizzone moved to Turris on a three-year contract. On 10 January 2023, Ardizzone was loaned by Lecco.

International career
Ardizzone capped 3 times in friendlies and 2 times in 2011 UEFA European Under-19 Football Championship elite qualification for Azzurrini in 2010–11 season. In 2011–12 season he was promoted to Italy U20 team. He played 3 times in 2011–12 Four Nations Tournament and two additional friendlies against Macedonia and Denmark.

Personal life
On 29 January 2021 he tested positive for COVID-19.

References

External links
 FIGC 
 Football.it Profile 
 

1992 births
Living people
Footballers from Palermo
Italian footballers
Italy youth international footballers
Association football midfielders
Serie B players
Serie C players
Palermo F.C. players
A.C. Reggiana 1919 players
F.C. Pro Vercelli 1892 players
Virtus Entella players
Cesena F.C. players
S.S. Turris Calcio players
Calcio Lecco 1912 players